Jacqueline Laura Hoffman (born November 29, 1960 in Queens, New York City) is an American actress, singer, and comedian known for her one-woman shows of Jewish-themed original songs and monologues. She is a veteran of Chicago's famed The Second City comedy improv group.

Hoffman was nominated for a Primetime Emmy Award and a Critics' Choice Television Award for her role as Mamacita in the miniseries Feud (2017).

Career

Stage
Hoffman won the Joseph Jefferson Award, Chicago's venerable theatre award, during her eight-year tenure with the Second City troupe. She starred in the following solo comedy performances: "If You Call This Living", "The Kvetching Continues", "Jackie Hoffman's Hanukkah", "A Chanukah Charol", "Jackie's Kosher Khristmas", and "Jackie's Valentine's Day Massacre", among others. Hoffman also joined the three-woman comic team behind "The J.A.P. Show, Jewish American Princesses of Comedy", at the Actors' Temple in April 2007.

She performed numerous roles in David and Amy Sedaris's 2001 comic play, The Book of Liz, winning an Obie Award. Her other theatrical credits include The Sisters Rosensweig, Straightjacket, Incident at Cobbler's Knob, and One Woman Shoe, for which she won a Jeff Award. In addition, she regularly performs at Joe's Pub in one-woman concerts.

In 2002, Hoffman was cast in the musical Hairspray on Broadway, playing the roles of Prudy Pingleton, Gym Teacher, Matron and Denizen of Baltimore. She won the 2003 Theatre World Award for her performance. She co-starred as Calliope, muse of epic poetry, in the rock musical Xanadu on Broadway, from July 2007 to September 2008. Hoffman starred as Grandmama in the Broadway musical The Addams Family, which opened at the Lunt-Fontanne Theatre on April 8, 2010 and closed on December 31, 2011. In 2010, she also parodied Lady Gaga's hit-single, Alejandro. She played Madame Dilly and other roles in the 2014 Broadway revival of On the Town until the show closed in September 2015. She played Mrs. Teavee in the Broadway production of Charlie and the Chocolate Factory, which opened on April 23, 2017 and closed January 14, 2018. In the summer of 2018, she joined the cast of the National Yiddish Theatre's production of Fiddler on the Roof as Yente the matchmaker.

In 2020, Hoffman appeared as Nicky in the musical podcast, Propaganda!

Film and television 

Hoffman has acted in the movies Kissing Jessica Stein, Mo' Money, Garden State, Down, Queer Duck: The Movie, Legally Blonde 2: Red, White and Blonde, and A Dirty Shame, and was the voice of the Water Cooler in Robots.

In addition to cameoing on the television show Curb Your Enthusiasm, she has appeared in many series, including Difficult People, Strangers with Candy, Hope and Faith, Ed, Starved, Cosby, 30 Rock, One Life to Live, The Other Two, Gilmore Girls: A Year in the Life, and was the voice of Dilmom on Dilbert.

Hoffman provided the voice of "Mary Phillips, the Talk Radio host", in the video game Grand Theft Auto: San Andreas. Despite her frequent stage banter on her dislike of children, Hoffman did a surprising turn as the voices of the Gate to Fairy-tale Land and the Witch's Magic Wand in the Dora the Explorer movie, Dora's Fairytale Adventure. She has also been a frequent guest on Late Night with Conan O'Brien.

In 2007 she was featured in the film Making Trouble, a tribute to female Jewish comedians, produced by the Jewish Women's Archive. In 2011, Hoffman appeared as a cameo in The Sitter as Mrs. Sapperstein. In 2012, she has had a recurring role in The New Normal. She appeared in a cameo role in the Oscar-winning movie Birdman in 2014.

In 2017, she starred in the first season of the FX series entitled Feud: Bette and Joan in the role of Joan Crawford's housekeeper, Mamacita, for which she was nominated for the Primetime Emmy Award for Outstanding Supporting Actress in a Limited Series or Movie.

In 2021-22, she acted in 11 episodes of the Hulu series Only Murders in the Building as supporting character Uma Heller, an amusingly caustic neighbor of the show's principal characters.

Discography 
Jackie Hoffman can be heard on the original Broadway cast recordings of Hairspray, Xanadu, The Addams Family, Charlie and the Chocolate Factory, the revival Broadway cast recording of On the Town, and the PS Classics' recording of Jackie Hoffman: Live at Joe's Pub released Fall 2008. She also appears on Scott Alan's CD, Dreaming Wide Awake, in a duet with Carly Jibson.

Personal life 
Hoffman was born in Queens, New York. She is friends with Stephen Colbert and his wife Evelyn McGee-Colbert, jokingly making a scene when she did not catch Evelyn's bouquet at the couple's 1993 wedding.

At age 46, during the run of her show Regrets Only, she was hospitalized for a hysterectomy to remove a benign tumor. She was back in three weeks, with a cot backstage for whenever she was not singing or talking.

She is married to jazz trumpeter Steve Smyth.

Stage credits

Partial filmography

Film

Television

References

External links 
 
 
 
 

1960 births
Living people
American women comedians
American film actresses
Jewish American female comedians
American stage actresses
American voice actresses
Jewish American actresses
Place of birth missing (living people)
20th-century American actresses
21st-century American actresses
Actresses from New York City
People from Queens, New York
Comedians from New York City
20th-century American comedians
21st-century American comedians
Theatre World Award winners
21st-century American Jews